The Men's field hockey Qualifying Tournament for the 2008 Summer Olympics were qualification tournaments to determine the final three spots for the 2008 Summer Olympics. The qualifying tournaments, which involved 18 teams divided into three groups, with three separate qualifying tournaments, were held in New Zealand, Chile and Japan, at different times in 2008. Only the winners of each qualifying tournament earned a berth in the 2008 Summer Olympics.

Teams
Below is the list of 18 teams who participated in these qualifying tournaments:

In addition, International Hockey Federation also named four reserve teams after four of the above teams are failed to make it in this qualifying tournament, two of them already confirmed to be in the reserve list:

 (replace Cuba in Qualifying 1)
 (replace Egypt in Qualifying 2)
 (replace Bangladesh in Qualifying 2)
 (replace Czech Republic in Qualifying 3)

Qualifying 1

Pool

Results
All times are New Zealand Summer Time (UTC+13)

Fifth and sixth

Third and fourth

Final

Awards

Final standings

 Qualified for the Summer Olympics

Qualifying 2

Pool

Results
All times are Chile Summer Time (UTC-3)

Fifth and sixth

Third and fourth

Final

Awards

Final standings

 Qualified for the Summer Olympics

Qualifying 3

Pool

Results

All times are Japan Standard Time (UTC+9)

Fifth and sixth

Third and fourth

Final

Awards

Final standings

 Qualified for the Summer Olympics

Notes

References

 
2008
2008 Summer Olympics Qualifier
2008 Summer Olympics Qualifier
2008 Summer Olympics Qualifier